Teshigawara is a Japanese surname. Notable people with the surname include:

, Japanese speed skater
, Japanese choreographer and dancer

Japanese-language surnames